Benoît Faure (11 January 1899, in Saint-Marcellin – 16 June 1980, in Montbrison) was a French professional road bicycle racer. Benoît Faure was a brother of cyclists Eugène Faure and Francis Faure.

Major results

1927
Circuit du Forez
1929
GP de Thizy
Tour de France:
Winner stage 13
1930
Circuit du Bourbonnais
Lyon-Geneve-Lyon
Tour de France:
8th place overall classification
1932
Paris - Caen
1936
Paris - Nantes
1939
Marseille - Toulon - Marseille
1941
Critérium International
GP d'Espéraza
Coupe Marcel Vergeat

External links 

Official Tour de France results for Benoît Faure

French male cyclists
1899 births
1980 deaths
French Tour de France stage winners
Sportspeople from Loire (department)
Tour de Suisse stage winners
Cyclists from Auvergne-Rhône-Alpes